Transcriptional regulator ATRX also known as  ATP-dependent helicase ATRX, X-linked helicase II, or X-linked nuclear protein (XNP) is a protein that in humans is encoded by the ATRX gene.

Function 

Transcriptional regulator ATRX contains an ATPase / helicase domain, and thus it belongs to the SWI/SNF family of chromatin remodeling proteins. ATRX is required for deposition of the histone variant H3.3 at telomeres and other genomic repeats. These interactions are important for maintaining silencing at these sites.

In addition, ATRX undergoes cell cycle-dependent phosphorylation, which regulates its nuclear matrix and chromatin association, and suggests its involvement in the gene regulation at interphase and chromosomal segregation in mitosis.

Clinical significance

Inherited mutations 

Inherited mutations of the ATRX  gene are associated with an X-linked mental retardation (XLMR) syndrome most often accompanied by alpha-thalassemia (ATR-X) syndrome. These mutations have been shown to cause diverse changes in the pattern of DNA methylation, which may provide a link between chromatin remodeling, DNA methylation, and gene expression in developmental processes. Multiple alternatively spliced transcript variants encoding distinct isoforms have been reported. Female carriers may demonstrate skewed X chromosome inactivation.

Somatic mutations 

Acquired mutations in ATRX have been reported in a number of human cancers including pancreatic neuroendocrine tumours, gliomas,  osteosarcomas, and malignant pheochromocytomas. There is a strong correlation between ATRX mutations and an Alternative Lengthening of Telomeres (ALT) phenotype in cancers.

Interactions 

ATRX forms a complex with DAXX which is an histone H3.3 chaperone.

ATRX has been also shown to interact with EZH2.

See also 
 Alpha-thalassemia mental retardation syndrome

References

Further reading

External links 
  GeneReviews/NCBI/NIH/UW entry on Alpha-Thalassemia X-Linked Mental Retardation Syndrome; ATRX Syndrome; Alpha Thalassemia/Mental Retardation, X-Linked; XLMR-Hypotonic Face Syndrome
  OMIM entries on Alpha-Thalassemia X-Linked Mental Retardation Syndrome